In Tibetan Buddhism, the Red Hat sect or Red Hat sects, named for the colour of the monks' hats at formal occasions, includes the three oldest of the four main schools of Tibetan Buddhism, namely Nyingma, Sakya and Kagyu.

The fourth school is Gelug and is known as the Yellow Hat sect.

A minority consider only the eldest school, the Nyingma school, to be the Red Hat sect.

Schools of Tibetan Buddhism